L’occasione fa il ladro, ossia Il cambio della valigia (English: Opportunity Makes a Thief, or The Exchanged Suitcase) is an opera (burletta per musica or farsa) in one act by Gioachino Rossini to an Italian libretto by Luigi Prividali, based on Le prétendu par hasard, ou L’occasion fait le larron, an 1810 vaudeville by Eugène Scribe.

Performance history
19th century

L’occasione fa il ladro was first performed at the Teatro San Moisè, Venice, on 24 November 1812.  Of the five one-act operas that he wrote for the theatre, this was the one performed most often during the composer's lifetime but it was neglected after his death.  There was, however, a revival at Pesaro in 1892 celebrating the hundredth anniversary of his birth there on 29 February 1792, with Alessandro Bonci.

20th century and beyond

The opera was given at the Théâtre Nouveau in Nice in 1983 and, in 1987, presented at the Rossini Opera Festival in Pesaro, directed by Jean-Pierre Ponnelle, where it was recorded. In the same year, it was given at the Buxton Festival. In addition it was "revived at the Macerata Opera (1992), in Paris, in Cologne and in the Schlosstheater Schwetzingen".

In April 1991 it was presented at the Politeama Garibaldi in Palermo, conducted by Antonello Allemandi with the orchestra and chorus of the Teatro Massimo. Rockwell Blake sang Count Alberto. A performance under Gianluigi Gelmetti with the Stuttgarter Rundfunkorchester was given in 1992, the cast including Susan Patterson and Alessandro Corbelli.

The Ponelle production was revived during the 2013 season at the Rossini Opera Festival.  One reviewer notes that the cast members were mostly native Italians.
 
In Britain, Opera North presented a number of English-language performances in 2004 as part of their Eight Little Greats season. The opera was entitled Love’s Luggage Lost, and the production was directed by Christopher Alden and conducted by David Parry.

The opera was presented in September 2017 at La Fenice, directed by Elisabetta Brusa, in collaboration with the Venetian Accademia di Belle Arti.

Roles

Synopsis
Time: 18th Century
Place: In and near Naples

During a storm, three travellers take refuge in an inn in the country.  Alberto has been betrothed to a woman whom he has never met, and is on his way to meet her.  Don Parmenione, accompanied by Martino, is trying to trace a friend's sister, who has disappeared.  When the storm is over, Alberto leaves, accidentally taking Parmenione's  luggage with him instead of his own.  Martino opens Alberto's suitcase and discovers, among his papers, a portrait, presumably of the bride-to-be.  Parmenione decides to masquerade as Albert and claim the bride for himself.

At Don Eusebio's house, Ernestina, who has fallen on hard times, agrees to extend her stay and take on the role of Berenice's companion.  Berenice, worried about marrying a man whom she has never met, asks Ernestina to pretend to be her.  She herself will meanwhile play the role of a maid, so that she can observe Alberto and decide whether she is prepared to marry him.  Parmenione, accompanied by Martino, now announces himself as Alberto and pays court to the disguised Ernestina, notwithstanding that she is not the lady in the portrait.  The two are attracted to each other.

Alberto himself arrives, and meets the pretended maid, Berenice.   A mutual attraction also springs up between these two, but Berenice is disconcerted to learn that Alberto has apparently already arrived and can prove who he is, whereas this man has no papers to identify him.  The real Alberto and the imposter each try to convince Eusebio that they are who they say they are, and Berenice, who knows which one she would rather marry, subjects Parmenione to a severe cross-examination.  He is eventually forced to admit his deception.  Berenice can now marry Alberto and Parmenione can marry Ernestina – who turns out to be the woman he was trying to trace, the sister of his friend.  And the portrait in Alberto's luggage?  It was of his own sister, to be given to Berenice as a wedding-present.

Recordings

References
Notes

Sources
 Gossett, Philip; Brauner, Patricia (2001), "L'occasione fa il ladro" in Holden, Amanda (ed.), The New Penguin Opera Guide, New York: Penguin Putnam. 
 Osborne, Charles (1994), The Bel Canto Operas of Rossini, Donizetti, and Bellini, London: Methuen; Portland, Oregon: Amadeus Press.  
 Osborne, Richard (1998), "L'occasione fa il ladro", in Stanley Sadie  (Ed.), The New Grove Dictionary of Opera, Vol. xxxx.  London: Macmillan Publishers, Inc.   

Operas by Gioachino Rossini
Italian-language operas
1812 operas
One-act operas
Operas
Operas based on works by Eugène Scribe